The quantum pendulum is fundamental in understanding hindered internal rotations in chemistry, quantum features of scattering atoms, as well as numerous other quantum phenomena.  Though a pendulum not subject to the small-angle approximation has an inherent nonlinearity, the Schrödinger equation for the quantized system can be solved relatively easily.

Schrödinger equation

Using Lagrangian mechanics from classical mechanics, one can develop a Hamiltonian for the system.  A simple pendulum has one generalized coordinate (the angular displacement ) and two constraints (the length of the string and the plane of motion).  The kinetic and potential energies of the system can be found to be

This results in the Hamiltonian

The time-dependent Schrödinger equation for the system is

One must solve the time-independent Schrödinger equation to find the energy levels and corresponding eigenstates.  This is best accomplished by changing the independent variable as follows:
 

This is simply Mathieu's differential equation

whose solutions are Mathieu functions.

Solutions

Energies
The characteristic values of the Mathieu cosine, sine functions respectively are written , where  is a natural number. The periodic special cases of the Mathieu cosine and sine functions are often written  respectively, although they are traditionally given a different normalization (namely, that their norm equals ).

The boundary conditions in the quantum pendulum imply that  are as follows for a given :

The energies of the system,  for even/odd solutions respectively, are quantized based on the characteristic values found by solving the Mathieu equation.

The effective potential depth can be defined as

A deep potential yields the dynamics of a particle in an independent potential.  In contrast, in a shallow potential, Bloch waves, as well as quantum tunneling, become of importance.

General solution
The general solution of the above differential equation for a given value of a and q is a set of linearly independent Mathieu cosines and Mathieu sines, which are even and odd solutions respectively.

Eigenstates

For positive values of q, the following is true:

Note that, for example,  (green) resembles a cosine function, but with flatter hills and shallower valleys.

See also 

 Quantum harmonic oscillator

Bibliography 

Muhammad Ayub, Atom Optics Quantum Pendulum, 2011, Islamabad, Pakistan., https://arxiv.org/abs/1012.6011

Quantum models
Pendulums